Michael John Norris (born October 1961) is the chief executive officer of Computacenter plc and the Non-Executive Chairman of Triage Services Ltd.

Early life and education
Norris was born in Chelmsford and educated in Southend-on-Sea, both in Essex. At school Norris proved to be skilled with mathematics but struggled with dyslexia. After his dyslexia was discovered he was allowed to enter exams 45 minutes earlier than other students to read through his test paper.

Norris has a degree in Computer Science and Mathematics, which he received from the University of East Anglia in 1983.

Career
Norris joined Computacenter as a salesperson in 1984, three years after the company began trading Following promotions in 1988 and 1992, Mike Norris became Computacenter's Chief Executive Officer in 1994.

Affiliations and interests

Confederation of British Industry
Norris is a member of the Confederation of British Industry (the "CBI") and is Chairman of its "Employment Policy Committee" ("EPC"), which is a policy-making body for issues relating to human resources, including labour market flexibility, employment legislation and productivity.

References

1961 births
Living people
Alumni of the University of East Anglia
British businesspeople
People from Chelmsford
People with dyslexia